Blarf (stylized in all caps) was a musical side project by American comedian Eric André. Blarf was originally a band consisting of André and other unnamed bandmates, but it quickly disbanded. In 2019, André revived the name of the band as a solo act, yet still acting as a band, and released the album Cease & Desist through Stones Throw Records.

History

After Eric André enrolled at the Berklee School of Music in Boston, Massachusetts, he formed the band Blarf with the goal of mimicking the styles of Frank Zappa and the Beastie Boys. The band was however short-lived due to the band's drummer getting "married at 18 to an extremely pro-life woman", and they had made a song called "I Love Abortions".

On December 25, 2014, André independently released a collaborative EP with Canadian record producer The First Seed, titled BLARF.

On June 6, 2019, it was announced that Blarf, a new artist signed to Stones Throw Records, would be releasing his debut studio album Cease & Desist on June 26. Blarf was soon rumored to be an alias of André, however Blarf denies it. André as himself even insists they are not the same person, writing on Twitter, "People are confusing this guy BLARF on @stonesthrow for me!"

The lead single to the album, "Badass Bullshit Benjamin Buttons Butthole Assassin", was released on June 18 with an accompanying music video. Cease & Desist was then released as scheduled on June 26, 2019, through Stones Throw. The album is heavily sample-based and contains elements of plunderphonics and noise music. Music videos for tracks "Banana" and "Boom Ba" were released on July 31 and August 12, 2019, respectively.

André performed live as Blarf for the first time on July 6, 2019, in Los Angeles with fellow experimental musicians Thundercat, DOMi and JD Beck. For his rare public appearances, he is seen wearing a Ronald McDonald costume as seen on the Cease & Desist cover art.

Discography

Blarf 

Blarf (stylized in all caps) is a collaborative EP by American comedian Eric André and Canadian electronic musician The First Seed. It was uploaded to The First Seed's Bandcamp on December 25, 2014.

Track listing
All tracks written by Eric André and produced by The First Seed.

Cease & Desist 

Cease & Desist is the debut studio album by Blarf, the experimental musician alter-ego of American comedian Eric André. It was released on June 26, 2019, by Stones Throw Records.

Track listing
All tracks written and produced by Eric André as Blarf.

References

American music